This is a round-up of the 1972 Sligo Senior Football Championship. Curry were champions in this year, claiming their second title in a decade, after defeating Enniscrone in the final. The holders, St. Patrick's, were surprisingly defeated in the opening round by Mullinabreena, which was their only Championship loss between 1970 and 1974.

First round

Quarter-finals

Semi-finals

Sligo Senior Football Championship Final

References

 Sligo Champion (Autumn 1972)

Sligo Senior Football Championship
Sligo